Anthony "Tony" G. Kiritsis (August 13, 1932 – January 28, 2005) was an American kidnapper.

Kiritsis was a resident of Indianapolis, Indiana, and had fallen behind on mortgage payments for a piece of real estate. In early February 1977, when his mortgage broker Richard O. Hall refused to give him additional time to pay, Kiritsis became convinced that Hall and Hall's father wanted the property. The property's value had increased and could be sold at a high profit. Hall claimed that he had proof of this in writing.

Crime

On Tuesday, February 8, 1977, Kiritsis went to Hall's office and wired the muzzle of a sawed-off shotgun to the back of Hall's head. The wire was also connected to the trigger and the other end was connected to Hall's neck. This "dead man's line" meant that if a policeman shot Kiritsis the shotgun would go off and shoot Hall in the head. The same would happen if Hall tried to escape. Kiritsis called the police from Hall's office and told them that he had taken Hall as a hostage.

Kiritsis held Hall hostage for 63 hours. During this time, most of which was spent in Kiritsis's apartment, he made frequent calls to radio station WIBC (1070 AM) newsman Fred Heckman, who broadcast what Kiritsis said. Finally, a lawyer said Hall had signed a document stating that he had mistreated Kiritsis and would pay him $5 million. The document also stated that Kiritsis would not be prosecuted or even arrested. Kiritsis then made a speech in front of live TV cameras declaring himself "a goddamned national hero." His speech became so emotional that some journalists thought he would shoot Hall, so they terminated the live broadcast. The police chief, Bill Fisher, in an interview said there was a mitigation plan in place, and if Fisher pulled a handkerchief out of his pocket, it would signal to launch that plan. Fisher would put the gun behind Kiritsis' ear and shoot him while another officer jammed the gun. Fisher said he had reached into his pocket for the handkerchief three times, but put it back each time.  Eventually, however, Kiritsis released Hall. He fired the shotgun into the air to prove it had been loaded and was immediately arrested. He was ultimately found not guilty by reason of insanity.

Most people who knew Kiritsis had positive things to say about him and were shocked by his actions. Kiritsis was described as "always helpful and kind to his neighbors, a hard worker and a strict law-and-order sort of man". Kiritsis also said several times that he did not want anyone to get hurt and apologized for the way he had treated Dick Hall. At his trial, psychiatrists said he was psychotic and in a "paranoid delusional state" during the hostage incident.

Later life
Kiritsis was released from a mental institution in January 1988, after the state could not prove he was still a danger to society. Kiritsis died in January 2005 at his home of natural causes. He was 72 years old.

Effects of the case
 At the time of the trial, Indiana law (and that of some other states) required the prosecution to disprove a defendant's claim of insanity, i.e. to prove the defendant sane, beyond a reasonable doubt. Directly as a result of the Kiritsis trial—particularly the testimony of chief defense psychiatrist Larry M. Davis—and the trial of John Hinckley Jr., Indiana and other states substantially revised their law to place the burden of proof for insanity-pleading defendants squarely on the shoulders of the defense.
 John H. Blair, a freelance photographer for UPI, took a photograph of the incident that won him the 1978 Pulitzer Prize for Spot News Photography.
 Footage of the incident was included in the 1982 documentary The Killing of America as one of many examples of violence in the United States.
 A feature-length documentary about the hostage incident called Dead Man's Line was released in 2017.
 A dramatization of the hostage incident starring Jon Hamm was released as an 8-episode podcast called American Hostage in 2022.

References

External links
Tony Kiritsis' Press Conference 
Kiritsis' Apartment
Documentary
"I'll Have Vengeance" – Time Magazine article
Legendary WIBC Newsman Key Figure in Ending Standoff
Kiritsis and Me: Enduring 63 Hours at Gunpoint by hostage Dick Hall

1932 births
2005 deaths
American kidnappers
American people of Greek descent
Hostage taking in the United States
People acquitted by reason of insanity
People from Indianapolis
Crime in Indianapolis
Crimes in Indiana
Criminal trials that ended in acquittal